Date Muneoki (1824 – February 9, 1898) was a Japanese politician of the early Meiji period who served as governor of Hiroshima Prefecture in 1871–1875.

Governors of Hiroshima
1824 births
1898 deaths
Japanese Home Ministry government officials